James Coffey is an American musician who specializes in composing and recording children's songs. He has released seven albums, including four on his own label, Blue Vision Music. He also has composed and recorded songs for a series of toy train albums and videos produced by TM Books & Video in Indiana and has released two albums on the TM label featuring songs introducing children to John Deere farm equipment.

History 
Coffey was born in Chicago, and raised in Fort Wayne, Indiana. Beginning on the piano at eight years old, he was trained as a classical pianist.

After high school, he joined a pop band. He went on to enter Indiana University, graduating in 1989 with a Masters of Education.

While at Indiana University, Coffey was taught musical form and analysis by Dr. James Ator, learned Eighteenth Century counterpoint from Darwin Lites, and was tutored by Masson Robertson in classical piano. Coffey also became piano soloist with the University's orchestra.

Coffey plays music for kids, having appeared on the Learning Channel program "The Kind Club", as well as releasing albums Come Ride with Me in 1997 and My Mama Was a Train in 2002, both featuring train songs to go with train-themed videos.

In 1994, Coffey began to focus entirely on music, creating a production company, Blue Vision Music, in 1995 to produce music aimed at children.

Notes 

Year of birth missing (living people)
Living people
People from Roanoke, Virginia
Musicians from Chicago
People from Chicago
People from Fort Wayne, Indiana
Indiana University alumni
20th-century American pianists
21st-century American pianists
American male pianists
20th-century American male musicians
21st-century American male musicians
American children's musicians